Prabha R. Chatterji is an Indian scientist at John F. Welch Technology Centre (formerly General Electric Global Research and Technology Development center), Bangalore, India.

She has been formerly a senior scientist at Indian Institute of Chemical Technology, Hyderabad and a past member of the Executive Committee of the Society for Biomaterials and Artificial Organs, India. She works primarily related to scientific and technical education in India.

Education
She graduated from a small college in a nondescript village near Ottappalam in Kerala. As a college student, she was awarded National Science Talent Search Scholarship by Indian Institute of Science, Bangalore. The scholarship helped her pursue her post graduation, PhD in 1977 and subsequently a career in Science.

Career 
Prabha's career trajectory involves stint in academia to governmental research and development and then to industry. She received the Vasvik Award for industrial research and the MRSI Lecture award. She is also involved in policies of scientific and technical education in India.

Works
Chatterji has published 41 papers and has an h-index of 16.

Awards
Chatterji is a recipient of the Vasvik Award (industrial research) and the MRSI Lecture award.

References

Articles created or expanded during Women's History Month (India) - 2014
Living people
Scientists from Bangalore
20th-century Indian chemists
Bengali chemists
Indian polymer scientists and engineers
Engineers from Kerala
People from Palakkad district
Indian Institute of Science alumni
Indian women engineers
20th-century Indian engineers
20th-century Indian women scientists
Indian women chemists
Women scientists from Kerala
20th-century women engineers
21st-century women engineers
Year of birth missing (living people)